The Aliens Act 1905 was an Act of the Parliament of the United Kingdom of Great Britain and Ireland. The Act introduced immigration controls and registration for the first time, and gave the Home Secretary overall responsibility for matters concerning immigration and nationality. Those who "appeared unable to support themselves" or "likely to become a charge upon the rates" were declared "undesirable". The Act also allowed to turn away potential immigrants on medical grounds. Asylum-seekers fleeing from religious or political persecution were supposedly exempted from the act but, nevertheless, their claims were often ignored.

While the Act was ostensibly designed to prevent paupers or criminals from entering the country and set up a mechanism to deport those who slipped through, one of its main objectives was to control Jewish immigration from Eastern Europe. Jewish immigration from Eastern Europe significantly increased after 1880 which served as some basis for the creation of the Aliens Act 1905. Although it remained in force, the 1905 Act was effectively subsumed by the Aliens Restriction Act 1914, which introduced far more restrictive provisions. It was eventually repealed by the Aliens Restriction (Amendment) Act 1919.

Demands for restriction

In the 19th century, the Russian Empire was home to about five million Jews, at the time, the "largest Jewish community in the world". Subjected to religious persecution, they were obliged to live in the Pale of Settlement, on the Polish-Russian borders, in conditions of great poverty. About half left, mostly for the United States, but many – about 150,000 – arrived in the United Kingdom, mostly in England. This reached its peak in the late 1890s, with "tens of thousands of Jews ... mostly poor, semi-skilled and unskilled" settling in the East End of London.

By the turn of the century, a media and public backlash had begun. The British Brothers' League was formed, with the support of prominent politicians such as William Evans-Gordon, MP for Stepney, organising marches and petitions. At rallies, its speakers said that Britain should not become "the dumping ground for the scum of Europe". In 1905, an editorial in the Manchester Evening Chronicle wrote "that the dirty, destitute, diseased, verminous and criminal foreigner who dumps himself on our soil and rates simultaneously, shall be forbidden to land". Antisemitism broke out into violence in South Wales in 1902 and 1903 where Jews were assaulted.

Aside from antisemitic sentiments, the act was also driven by the economic and social unrest in the East End of London where most immigrants settled. Work was difficult to come by and families required all members to contribute.

Future Prime Minister Winston Churchill opposed the bill. He stated that the bill would "appeal to insular prejudice against foreigners, to racial prejudice against Jews, and to labour prejudice against competition" and expressed himself in favour of "the old tolerant and generous practice of free entry and asylum to which this country has so long adhered and from which it has so greatly gained". On 31 May 1904, he crossed the floor, defecting from the Conservatives to sit as a member of the Liberal Party in the House of Commons.

See also

 Edict of Expulsion 1290 was a prior legal measure against Jewish people under English law.

References

Further reading
 Bernard Gainer, The Alien Invasion: The Origins of the Aliens Act of 1905 (London, Heinemann Educational books Ltd, 1972)
 Feldman, David. "Was the Nineteenth Century a Golden Age for Immigrants?" in Andreas Fahrmeir et al., eds., Migration Control in the North Atlantic World: The Evolution of State Practices in Europe and the United States from the French Revolution to the Inter-War Period (2003); pp 167–77 shows the actual impact of the 1905 law was small and largely bureaucratic.
 Garrard,  John A. The English and Immigration, 1880-1910 (1971)
Gartner, Lloyd A. The Jewish Immigrant in England 1870-1914, London (1960): Simon Publications.
 Pellew,  Jill.  "The Home Office and the Aliens Act, 1905," The Historical Journal, Vol. 32, No. 2 (Jun., 1989), pp. 369–385  in JSTOR

External links
 Channel 4 Immigration by David Rosenberg
 Moving Here: British Immigration law repository
 UK Immigration Service

Jews and Judaism in England
United Kingdom Acts of Parliament 1905
Immigration law in the United Kingdom
History of immigration to the United Kingdom
Immigration legislation
Antisemitism in the United Kingdom